Loch Bì, sometimes anglicised as Loch Bee, is the largest loch on the island of South Uist in the Outer Hebrides of Scotland. It lies at the northern end of the island

Loch Bì is reputed for its trout, flounder and mullet stock.

Loch Bì is bisected by a causeway carrying the A865 road. The first causeway was built in the 17th century, with the existing structure having been completed in 1990.

References

Freshwater lochs of Scotland
South Uist